The 2007–08 Worthington's District Cup is the national Rugby Union district cup competition of Wales. It is the 35th annual Welsh Districts cup. The Winners of this year's competition are Cambrian Welfare RFC (2 times 1996–97, 2007–08).

2006-07 final
The 2006-07 Final took place at the Millennium Stadium, Cardiff. The final was competed between Blackwood Stars RFC and Bryncethin RFC. The final score was 28 - 18 to Blackwood Stars RFC who won the competition for the second time.

Matches

Round 3

Round 4

Finals

Quarter-finals

Semi-finals

Final

Worthington
Worthington's District Cup
Wortinh